David Hull may refer to:
David Hull (philosopher) (1935–2010), American philosopher
Dave Hull (born c. 1933), Los Angeles radio personality "The Hullabalooer"
David Hull (rugby league) (born 1951), English rugby league footballer of the 1970s and 1980s
Dave Hull (rugby league) (born 1985), English rugby league footballer of the 2000s and 2010s
David Hull (musician), American bass guitar player
David Carlisle Hull (1869–1928), president of the Mississippi Agricultural and Mechanical College
David P. Hull (1817–?), member of the Wisconsin State Assembly
David Wayne Hull (born 1962), leader of the White Knights of the Ku Klux Klan
David Hull (bowls) (born 1944), Irish lawn and indoor bowler
David Hull (actor) (born 1985), American actor
David Hull (paediatrician) (1932–2021), British paediatrician